Abrogation may refer to:
 Abrogatio, the Latin term for legal annulment under Roman law
 Abrogation of Old Covenant laws, the ending or setting aside of Old Testament stipulations for the New Testament
 Abrogation doctrine, a doctrine in United States constitutional law
 Naskh (tafsir) (Arabic for abrogation), a genre of Islamic exegesis dealing with conflicting material in Islamic law
 Abrogation in public law, the doctrine of abrogation in UK public law

See also
 Adrogation, a form of adoption in Ancient Rome
 Obrogation, the enacting of a contrary law that is a revocation of a previous law